Jealousy (Finnish: Mustasukkaisuus) is a 1953 Finnish drama film directed by Teuvo Tulio and starring Regina Linnanheimo, Eero Paganus and Assi Raine. It was a remake of Restless Blood (1946).
The film was shot in parallel with the Swedish-language version Två kvinnor.

Cast
 Regina Linnanheimo as Riitta Maras  
 Eero Paganus as Jyri Maras  
 Assi Raine as Anja  
 Annie Mörk as Grandmother  
 Paavo Jännes as Doctor  
 Lauri Korpela as Owner of the sawmill  
 Kyösti Erämaa as Inspector  
 Onni Hannukainen as Jacklighter  
 F.E. Sillanpää as Man at the dances  
 Helvi Järveläinen as Woman at the dances

References

Bibliography 
 Pietari Kääpä. Directory of World Cinema: Finland. Intellect Books, 2012.

External links 
 

1953 films
1953 drama films
Finnish drama films
1950s Finnish-language films
Films directed by Teuvo Tulio
Remakes of Finnish films
Finnish black-and-white films